Ingram is an unincorporated community in Halifax County, Virginia, United States.

References

Unincorporated communities in Halifax County, Virginia
Unincorporated communities in Virginia